CMS Made Simple (CMSMS) is a free, open source (GPL) content management system (CMS) to provide developers, programmers and site owners a web-based development and administration area. In 2017 it won the CMS Critic annual award for Best Open Source Content Management.

Software Design 
CMS Made Simple is an open source package, built using PHP with support for MySQL. Although PostgreSQL was previously supported, the developers chose to remove PostgreSQL support and recent versions no longer support any database except MySQL. The template system is driven using the Smarty Template Engine. CMS Made Simple aims to provide easy development and customization with themes, add-on modules, dynamic menus, tags and translations. When developing a new feature, the tab opens full of default text. The developer starts by erasing the bits he doesn't need, and then adding further tags that link to plugins, known here as modules. As it suggests you customise existing working markup code.

Features and Intended Audience 
CMS Made Simple has a web-based admin section for theme, template, and style-sheet development, installing and updating add-on modules, configuring page content blocks, and user groups and permissions.

As a development tool, CMS Made Simple has an intended audience of the more experienced developer.  Developing an effective site requires a working knowledge of at least HTML and CSS.  Whilst there is support for installation and subsequent application of a pre-designed theme (such as those available on Drupal), the system allows for the direct coding of page templates in HTML/CSS with the dynamic elements called in using Smarty tags. 

Once a CMS Made Simple website is built, using the system for day-to-day content management tasks such as maintenance of a gallery, maintenance of news/blogs and page editing is designed to be straightforward and manageable by non-technical individuals such as site owners.

Modules and Themes

Modules 
CMS Made Simple itself is designed as a base package that does not impose unnecessary modules and functionality on the user. It requires that site owners add modules and tags appropriate to the site. A small number of core modules are included with the default installation, notably a news manager, search function, and WYSIWYG editor (MicroTiny, a small, streamlined version of  TinyMCE).

Plugins: add-on modules 
 Galleries
Member areas (password protected)
Company and User Directories
 Guestbooks
 Form Builders
 Captchas
 E-Commerce / shops
 Calendars
 Blogs
 RSS
Custom module creators

Numerous additional modules are available via the module repository or Module Manager

Themes 
The internal template and stylesheet system allows for end-user theme creation, but others are available in a themes repository to download. Developers can choose the one that is closest to their wishes and customise further.

Support 
Support for CMS Made Simple includes the content installed by default, built-in help, online docs, commercial/paid support, and a community.

CMS Made Simple holds an annual meeting for its enthusiasts known as The Geek Moot where how-to seminars and Q&A discussions are held.

History and Awards 
‘Best Open Source CMS’ Winner in the CMS Critic 2017 Awards.

'Peoples Choice Award' in the CMS Critic 2014 Awards.

‘Best Budget CMS - Critics Choice’ Nominee in the CMS Critic 2012 Awards.

‘Best Open Source CMS’ Winner in the Packt Publishing 2010 Awards.

Oct, 2009 - Three Quarters of a Million Downloads Reached
 Aug, 2010 - CMS Made Simple Reaches One Million Downloads

See also

 Content management system
 List of content management systems

References

External links
Official sites
 Official site of CMS Made Simple
 Official Support Forum
 Official Core & Module Development Forge
 Official Documentation
Tutorials
 Tutorial for beginners

Free content management systems